Théophile Berlier (1 February 1761 in Dijon – 12 September 1844 in Dijon) was a French jurist and politician, who was a member of the National Convention from 1792 until 1795.

References

References

1761 births
1844 deaths
Politicians from Dijon
Presidents of the National Convention
18th-century French lawyers
Regicides of Louis XVI
Members of the Council of Five Hundred
Counts of the First French Empire
Commandeurs of the Légion d'honneur